A Child of the Community is a 1953 Yugoslav comedy film directed by Mladomir Puriša Đorđević and starring Viktor Starčić, Elma Karlowa and Aleksandar Stojković.

Cast

 Viktor Starčić as Sima Nedeljković 
 Elma Karlowa as Elza 
 Aleksandar Stojković as Sveštenik 
 Milan Ajvaz as Izaslanik kralja Aleksandra  
 Mija Aleksić as Advokat Fića  
 Dušan Antonijević as Konobar (I)  
 Dejan Dubajić as Karanfilović  
 Sima Janićijević as Konobar (II)  
 Vuka Kostić 
 Ljubica Ković 
 Predrag Laković as Bogoslov  
 Petar Matić 
 Bata Paskaljević as Profesor klavira  
 Raša Plaović as Vladika  
 Nikola Popović 
 Milivoje Popović-Mavid as Artiljerijski kapetan  
 Branka Veselinović as Seljanka  
 Mlađa Veselinović 
 Stevo Vujatović 
 Jelena Žigon 
 Milivoje Živanović

References

Bibliography 
 Liehm, Mira & Liehm, Antonín J. The Most Important Art: Eastern European Film After 1945. University of California Press, 1977.

External links 
 

1953 films
1953 comedy films
Yugoslav comedy films
Serbo-Croatian-language films
Films directed by Mladomir Puriša Đorđević
Yugoslav black-and-white films
Films set in Yugoslavia